José Manuel Campa Fernández (born 20 July 1964) is a Spanish economist, economy professor and politician who has been serving as the chairperson of the European Banking Authority since May 2019. Prior to this, he has been a senior member of Santander Bank and has previously served as the 10th Secretary of State for Economy in the Government of Spain.

Biography
Campa has a degree in law and economics from the University of Oviedo and a PhD in economics from Harvard University.

Between 14 May 2009 and 23 December 2011 he served as the Secretary of State for Economy of the Spanish government under the premiership of José Luis Rodríguez Zapatero.

Before being Secretary of State he was finance professor in the IESE Business School of the University of Navarre.

He has been a consultant of the World Bank, of the International Monetary Found, the Inter-American Development Bank, of the Federal Reserve Bank of New York, of the Bank for International Settlements, of the European Commission and of the Bank of Spain.

In 2014 he was appointed Director of Investor Relations and Analysts of the Santander Bank. He continues being finance professor of the IESE Business School as an External Collaborating Professor.

On 19 February 2019 he was nominated to be the next Chairperson of the European Banking Authority, replacing Andrea Enria. The European Parliament approved the nomination on 14 March 2019. He assumed the office on 1 May 2019.

References

1964 births
Living people
Spanish politicians
Spanish businesspeople
Spanish bankers
University of Oviedo alumni
Harvard Graduate School of Arts and Sciences alumni